The 2010–11 season was the 112th season of competitive league football in the history of English football club Wolverhampton Wanderers. The club competed in the Premier League, the highest level of English football, for a second consecutive season.

Although this season was the club's 62nd at the top level of English football, it was the first time they had faced consecutive campaigns in the highest division since 1981–82. The previous season had seen them survive their return to the highest level with a 15th-place finish, eight points above the relegation zone.

The club survived for a second successive season after finishing 17th, one place above the relegation zone. Despite losing their final fixture, results elsewhere on the final day kept Wolves one point ahead of the bottom three teams.

Season review
Preparing for their second consecutive season in the Premier League, the club made five new additions. Beside turning the loan of Adlène Guedioura into a permanent deal, the summer also saw the arrival of Belgian international defender Jelle Van Damme, and two players captured from relegated Hull City - Steven Mouyokolo and Stephen Hunt; the latter ending a pursuit that had begun during the previous transfer window. Their most expensive new addition was striker Steven Fletcher who equalled the club's record fee of £6.5 million in joining from another relegated side, Burnley. For a third successive season, England under-21 defender Michael Mancienne joined on loan from Chelsea.

Those players not involved in the World Cup Finals resumed training at their Sir Jack Hayward training ground on 28 June, before travelling for a four-day stay in Dublin, where they undertook their first pre-season game. Preparations were completed with the only home friendly, a game against La Liga side Atletico Bilbao.

Competitive action began with a 2–1 victory over Stoke City, the first opening game Wolves had won since 1999. Two successive draws followed to push them up to fourth place, the highest position the club had occupied in the English football system since October 1979. However, after losing their unbeaten start with an injury time defeat at Fulham, the team tumbled down the table after a run of five defeats in their next six games.

Three points were finally gained after defeating big-spending Manchester City in late October, but a run of four successive losses followed. Two late goals at home to Sunderland swung the game in Wolves' favour to keep them in touch with fellow strugglers Wigan and West Ham at the end of November. December brought two defeats, but also two much-needed victories - against local rivals Birmingham City, and a shock win at Anfield; their first since 1984. 

The January transfer window saw the exit of Jelle Van Damme, who returned to Belgium after failing to settle in England. Two young players arrived in permanent deals - winger Adam Hammill from Championship team Barnsley, and Scottish forward Leigh Griffiths. On the field, the year began with a loss at relegation rivals West Ham before an unexpected win at home to reigning champions Chelsea. Three successive league defeats, and an exit from the FA Cup followed, before the team again turned the table on its head by ending Manchester United's 29-match unbeaten streak.

The first Black Country derby in the top flight for 27 years arrived in February, after snow had caused the original December date to be postponed.  The game ended all square, but only after West Bromwich Albion had canceled out loanee Jamie O'Hara's opener with a stoppage time equaliser. The next weekend saw Wolves record their biggest victory of the Premier League era, as they thumped Blackpool 4–0 to lift themselves out of the relegation zone for the first time since September. Four more points then followed, after games with Tottenham and Aston Villa.

April brought the news that striker Kevin Doyle had suffered ligament damage while on international duty with the Republic of Ireland and would struggle to feature again during the season. As manager Mick McCarthy switched formations and line-ups to try to replace Doyle as the spearhead of a 4–5–1 formation, the team endured a run of just two points from a possible 15. With three games remaining the team remained in the drop zone, but in touch with a number of other clubs. The renewed goalscoring form of Steven Fletcher, helped yield two successive 3–1 victories that clawed the team out of the relegation zone before the final day.

The final day of the 2010–11 season featured one of the tightest ever relegation battles. At the start of the day, six teams had still not assured their safety - with one, West Ham, already condemned to relegation. The remaining two places could potentially be filled by Wolves, Blackburn, Birmingham, Blackpool or Wigan. Wolves faced Blackburn at Molineux in the final game to feature the North Bank stand that had stood since 1992.

A dismal first half performance left the home side 0–3 down at the half time interval, meaning they occupied a relegation place. Despite moving up to 17th after Birmingham fell behind at Tottenham early in the second half, two key goals in the same minute sunk Wolves back into the mire as Birmingham equalised, and Wigan took the lead in their game at Stoke. With just three minutes remaining at Molineux, a goal by Stephen Hunt reduced the deficit to 2–3, meaning Wolves were safe by virtue of goals scored (having tied Birmingham on points and goal difference). An injury time goal by Tottenham then ended all doubt and sent Birmingham down, along with Blackpool who had eventually lost at champions Manchester United despite having at one point led.

Wolves had survived in 17th place, on 40 points, a two-point improvement on the previous campaign despite a much more nervous finale.

Results

Pre season
Wolves' seven pre season games saw them face opposition from five different leagues. As had become common in recent years, only their final game was held at their Molineux home. A second "Wolves Development XI" team largely comprising academy prospects also played a series of matches during this period.

"Wolves Development XI" pre season results (all away): 4–1 v Lisburn Distillery (15 July), 1–0 v Glenavon (17 July), 0–2 v Newport County (23 July), 1–0 v Cheltenham Town (30 July), 7–1 v Chasetown (2 August), 4–2 v Telford United (10 August)

Premier League

A total of 20 teams competed in the Premier League in the 2010–11 season. Each team played every other team twice: once at their stadium, and once at the opposition's. Three points were awarded to teams for each win, one point per draw, and none for defeats.

The provisional fixture list was released on 17 June 2010, but was subject to change in the event of matches being selected for television coverage or police concerns.

Final table

Results summary

Source: Statto.com

Results by round

FA Cup

League Cup

Players
New squad rules operated in the Premier League for the season. Squads were capped at 25 senior players (those aged 21 and above at the beginning of 2010), and all squads had to include a minimum of 8 "homegrown" players. Wolves squads included 14, then 15, such players.

Statistics

|-
|align="left"|||align="left"|||align="left"| 
|14||0||3||0||0||0||17||0||1||0||
|-
|align="left"|||align="left"|||align="left"|  †
|||||0||0||0||0||style="background:#98FB98"|||1||2||0||
|-
|align="left"|||align="left"|||align="left"| 
|||||2||0||3||1||||3||5||1||
|-
|align="left"|||align="left"|||align="left"| 
|||||||0||1||0||||1||1||0||
|-
|align="left"|||align="left"|||align="left"| 
|||0||3||0||2||1||||1||6||0||
|-
|align="left"|||align="left"|||align="left"| 
|||||1||0||0||0||||1||5||0||
|-
|align="left"|||align="left"|||align="left"| 
|||0||0||0||0||0||||0||1||0||
|-
|align="left"|||align="left"|||align="left"|  (c)
|||0||2||0||0||0||||0||8||1||
|-
|align="left"|||align="left"|FW||align="left"| 
|||||||0||||0||||7||0||0||
|-
|align="left"|10||align="left"|FW||align="left"| 
|||10||3||1||||1||style="background:#98FB98"|||12||1||0||
|-
|align="left"|11||align="left"|||align="left"| 
|||||||0||0||0||||1||2||0||
|-
|align="left"|12||align="left"|||align="left"| 
|||||3||1||1||0||style="background:#98FB98"|||4||5||0||
|-
|align="left"|13||align="left"|||align="left"| 
|24||0||0||0||3||0||27||0||0||0||
|-
|align="left"|14||align="left"|||align="left"| 
|||||||1||1||0||||2||1||0||
|-
|align="left"|15||align="left"|||align="left"|  ¤
|||0||0||0||2||0||||0||1||0||
|-
|align="left"|16||align="left"|||align="left"| 
|||0||2||0||2||0||||0||6||1||
|-
|align="left"|17||align="left"|||align="left"| 
|||||||1||1||0||||5||2||0||
|-
|align="left"|18||align="left"|FW||align="left"|  ¤
|||0||||0||0||0||||0||0||0||
|-
|align="left"|19||align="left"|FW||align="left"|  ¤
|||0||0||0||0||0||||0||0||0||
|-
|align="left"|19||align="left"|FW||  style="background:#faecc8; text-align:left;"|  ‡ 
|||0||0||0||||0||style="background:#98FB98"|||0||0||0||
|-
|align="left"|19||align="left"|||align="left"| 
|||0||0||0||0||0||style="background:#98FB98"|||0||0||0||
|-
|align="left"|20||align="left"|||align="left"| 
|||||2||1||2||2||||5||2||0||
|-
|align="left"|21||align="left"|||  style="background:#faecc8; text-align:left;"|  ‡ 
|||0||0||0||1||0||||0||1||0||
|-
|align="left"|22||align="left"|||align="left"| 
|||0||1||0||2||0||style="background:#98FB98"|||0||0||0||
|-
|align="left"|23||align="left"|||align="left"| 
|||||2||0||1||0||||1||5||0||
|-
|align="left"|24||align="left"|||  style="background:#faecc8; text-align:left;"|  ‡  
|||||0||0||0||0||style="background:#98FB98"|||3||3||0||
|-
|align="left"|25||align="left"|||  style="background:#faecc8; text-align:left;"|  ‡  
|||0||1||1||||0||||1||0||0||
|-
|align="left"|26||align="left"|||align="left"|  ¤ †
|0||0||0||0||0||0||0||0||0||0||
|-
|align="left"|26||align="left"|||align="left"| 
|0||0||0||0||0||0||0||0||0||0||
|-
|align="left"|28||align="left"|FW||align="left"| 
|0||0||0||0||0||0||0||0||0||0||
|-
|align="left"|29||align="left"|FW||align="left"| 
|||||||1||||2||||8||1||0||
|-
|align="left"|30||align="left"|||align="left"|  ¤
|0||0||0||0||0||0||0||0||0||0||
|-
|align="left"|31||align="left"|||align="left"|  †
|0||0||0||0||0||0||0||0||0||0||
|-
|align="left"|32||align="left"|||align="left"| 
|||||0||0||||1||||3||4||0||
|-
|align="left"|33||align="left"|FW||align="left"|  ¤
|0||0||0||0||0||0||0||0||0||0||
|-
|align="left"|34||align="left"|||align="left"| 
|||||0||0||2||0||||1||3||0||
|-
|align="left"|35||align="left"|||align="left"| 
|0||0||0||0||0||0||0||0||0||0||
|-
|align="left"|36||align="left"|||align="left"|  ¤
|0||0||0||0||0||0||0||0||0||0||
|-
|align="left"|37||align="left"|||align="left"|  ¤
|0||0||0||0||0||0||0||0||0||0||
|-
|align="left"|38||align="left"|FW||align="left"|  ¤
|0||0||0||0||1||0||style="background:#98FB98"|1||0||1||0||
|-
|align="left"|39||align="left"|||align="left"|  ¤
|0||0||0||0||1||0||style="background:#98FB98"|1||0||0||0||
|-
|align="left"|40||align="left"|FW||align="left"|  ¤
|0||0||0||0||1||0||1||0||0||0||
|-
|align="left"|41||align="left"|||align="left"|  ¤
|0||0||0||0||0||0||0||0||0||0||
|-
|align="left"|42||align="left"|FW||align="left"| 
|0||0||0||0||0||0||0||0||0||0||
|-
|align="left"|43||align="left"|||align="left"|  ¤
|0||0||0||0||0||0||0||0||0||0||
|-
|align="left"|44||align="left"|||align="left"| 
|0||0||0||0||0||0||0||0||0||0||
|-
|align="left"|45||align="left"|||align="left"|  ¤
|0||0||0||0||0||0||0||0||0||0||
|-
|align="left"|46||align="left"|||align="left"| 
|0||0||1||0||0||0||style="background:#98FB98"|1||0||0||0||
|}

Awards

Transfers

In

Out

Loans in

Loans out

Management and coaching staff

Kit
The season saw new home and away kits, both manufactured by new supplier BURRDA. The home kit featured the club's traditional gold and black colours while the away kit was all black with gold piping. Both shirts featured the internet gambling company Sportingbet.com as sponsor.

References

2010–11 Premier League by team
2010-11